Noriko Horiuchi (堀内 詔子, Horiuchi Noriko, born October 28, 1965) is a Japanese politician and member of the House of Representatives, since 2012, representing the Yamanashi 2nd district. She served as Minister for the Tokyo Olympic and Paralympic Games and Minister in Charge of Promoting Vaccinations. She had been in Prime Minister Fumio Kishida's Cabinet since 4 October 2021 until 31 March 2022. Noriko Horiuchi was preceded by Tamayo Marukawa as Minister for the Tokyo Olympic and Paralympic Games and by Taro Kono as Minister in Charge of Vaccination. She is a member of the Liberal Democratic Party.

Noriko Horiuchi already performed the following roles:

 Director of Fujiyama Museum;
 Parliamentary Vice-Minister of Health, Labour and Welfare;
 Director, Committee on Health, Labour and Welfare;
 Director, Special Committee on Consumer Affairs;
 Member, Special Committee on Reconstruction after Great East Japan Earthquake;
 Deputy Director, Women's Affairs Division of Policy Research Council;
 Deputy Director, Health, Labour and Welfare Division;
 Director, Women's Affairs Division, Federation of Yamanashi Prefecture Liberal Democratic Party Branches.

References 
Living people
1965 births
Liberal Democratic Party (Japan) politicians
Women government ministers of Japan
21st-century Japanese women politicians
21st-century Japanese politicians
Members of the House of Representatives (Japan)